Anthony Fisher (אנתוני פישר; born January 31, 1986) is an American-Israeli basketball player for Maccabi Haifa in the Israel Basketball Premier League.  He plays the shooting guard position.

Early and personal life
He was born in Alpharetta, Georgia. His parents are William and Sandra Fisher.  He is 6' 3" (1.91 m) tall, and weighs 185 pounds (84 kg).

Basketball career
He attended Chattahoochee High School ('04) in Johns Creek, Georgia.  Playing basketball there, as a senior he averaged 20 points and 4 assists per game, won the Fulton County and Regional Player of the Year awards, and was Georgia Class 5A All-State team.

He attended Tennessee Tech ('08). Playing for the basketball team, in 2006–07 he was third in the Ohio Valley Conference in points per game (17.2), free throw percentage (.799) and assists per game (4.2), and seventh in field goal percentage (.417). In 2007–08 he was fourth in the OVC in points per game (17.1). In 2007 he was All-OVC First Team, and in 2008 he was All-OVC Second Team. His 1,726 career points are fifth-most in team history.

On May 20, 2020, he signed with Maccabi Haifa in the Israel Basketball Premier League.

References 

1986 births
Living people
American expatriate basketball people in Israel
American men's basketball players
Hapoel Be'er Sheva B.C. players
Israeli American
People from Alpharetta, Georgia
Shooting guards
Sportspeople from Fulton County, Georgia
Tennessee Tech Golden Eagles men's basketball players